Zhuodaoquan Temple, historically Yuquan Temple, is a Buddhist temple and Martial temple located on the southwest hillside of Mount Fuhu, in Zhuodaoquan Subdistrict, Hongshan of Wuhan, Hubei, China.

History
In a fit of anger, Guan Yu thrust his sword into a rock (zhuódāo). This opened up a spring which provided water for his troops and their horses to drink. Zhuodaoquan Temple takes its name from this story. Their horses were kept at nearby Mount Mafang ("Horse Stable Mountain") on the present-day campus of the Wuhan University of Technology.

The temple was built during the Song Dynasty. It was originally named Yuquan Temple. It was destroyed and rebuilt many times over the course of the Ming Dynasty. It was rebuilt again during the reign of the Kangxi Emperor.

During the Taiping Rebellion in the 1850s, Zhuodaoquan Temple was destroyed. It was rebuilt in 1858 after the recapturing of Wuchang by Qing forces. In 1876, 1,000 trees were planted around the temple.

In 1916, the temple was renovated in the style of Siheyuan and included statues of Liu Bei, Guan Yu, and Zhang Fei.

The temple was used as a headquarters for military operations during the Northern Expedition.

In 1956, the temple was repaired by the Wuhan City government. In 1959, the temple was recognized as an important cultural heritage site.

The temple and statues were damaged during the Cultural Revolution. The temple was reopened in 1988.

In 2010, Hongshan District refurbished and restored the temple increasing the overall area of the temple. The well connecting to the Zhuodao Spring was restored.

Gallery

References

Buddhist temples in Hubei
Religious buildings and structures in Wuhan